Gnowit is a real-time media monitoring software tool that provides detailed analysis for media analysts, marketing management, and PR organizations. For years companies would have to rely on humans to perform this analysis but Gnowit employs automation with the use of artificial intelligence. The company is based in Ottawa and is part of the Invest Ottawa incubator program. Co-founded by both Shahzad Khan and Mohammad Al-Azzouni in 2010, they worked on the product for a number of years before launching their media monitoring service in April 2013.

History 
Mr. Khan studied and received his Ph.D at the University of Cambridge before coming to Canada in 2007. He worked for the education and web training company Distil Interactive for a number of years. This company was acquired in 2009 by the Canadian Standards Association in 2009 and Mr. Khan moved on to do consulting. He eventually met Mohammad Al-Azzouni, a student at the University of Ottawa at the time, and together they co-founded Gnowit in 2010.

Technology 
Gnowit's real-time media monitoring technology is automated and can provide the sentiment of online mentions, identify the core issues, and provide article summaries. Most organizations use this technology as a tool for competitive intelligence, threat analysis, and brand management.

References

External links 
 Official Website

Canadian companies established in 2010
Social media
Mass media monitoring
Technology companies established in 2010